George Wright (born 24 November 1952) is a British psychologist.

Wright completed a BSc degree in psychology at the University of London, followed by a master's degree and doctorate in the same subject from Brunel University London. In 2013, Wright earned a DSc from the University of Warwick. 

Wright has taught at several institutions throughout his career, including Leeds University Business School, London Business School, Strathclyde Business School, Durham Business School, and Warwick Business School. Wright has served as chief editor of the Journal of Behavioral Decision Making since the publication was founded in 1988.

References

1952 births
Living people
Alumni of Brunel University London
Alumni of the University of London
Academics of the University of Strathclyde
Academics of the University of London
Academics of the University of Leeds
Academics of Durham University
Academics of the University of Warwick
Academic journal editors
20th-century British male writers
21st-century British male writers
British psychologists
20th-century psychologists
21st-century British psychologists